Quantum game theory is an extension of classical game theory to the quantum domain. It differs from classical game theory in three primary ways:
Superposed initial states,
Quantum entanglement of initial states,
Superposition of strategies to be used on the initial states.

This theory is based on the physics of information much like quantum computing.

History 
In 1999, a professor in the math department at the University of California at San Diego named David A. Meyer first published Quantum Strategies which details a quantum version of the classical game theory game, matching pennies. In the quantum version, players are allowed access to quantum signals through the phenomenon of quantum entanglement.

Superposed initial states 
The information transfer that occurs during a game can be viewed as a physical process.
In the simplest case of a classical game between two players with two strategies each, both the players can use a bit (a '0' or a '1') to convey their choice of strategy. A popular example of such a game is the prisoners' dilemma, where each of the convicts can either cooperate or defect: withholding knowledge or revealing that the other committed the crime. In the quantum version of the game, the bit is replaced by the qubit, which is a quantum superposition of two or more base states. In the case of a two-strategy game this can be physically implemented by the use of an entity like the electron which has a superposed spin state, with the base states being +1/2 (plus half) and −1/2 (minus half). Each of the spin states can be used to represent each of the two strategies available to the players. When a measurement is made on the electron, it collapses to one of the base states, thus conveying the strategy used by the player.

Entangled initial states 
The set of qubits which are initially provided to each of the players (to be used to convey their choice of strategy) may be entangled. For instance, an entangled pair of qubits implies that an operation performed on one of the qubits, affects the other qubit as well, thus altering the expected pay-offs of the game.

Superposition of strategies to be used on initial states 
The job of a player in a game is to choose a strategy. In terms of bits this means that the player has to choose between 'flipping' the bit to its opposite state or leaving its current state untouched. When extended to the quantum domain this implies that the player can rotate the qubit to a new state, thus changing the probability amplitudes of each of the base states. Such operations on the qubits are required to be unitary transformations on the initial state of the qubit. This is different from the classical procedure which chooses the strategies with some statistical probabilities.

Multiplayer games 
Introducing quantum information into multiplayer games allows a new type of "equilibrium strategy" which is not found in traditional games. The entanglement of players' choices can have the effect of a contract by preventing players from profiting from other player's betrayal.

Quantum Prisoner's Dilemma

The Classical Prisoner's Dilemma is a game played between two players with a choice to cooperate with or betray their opponent. Classically, the dominant strategy is to always choose betrayal. When both players choose this strategy every turn, they each ensure a suboptimal profit, but cannot lose, and the game is said to have reached a Nash equilibrium. Profit would be maximized for both players if each chose to cooperate every turn, but this is not the rational choice, thus a suboptimal solution is the dominant outcome. In the Quantum Prisoner’s Dilemma, both parties choosing to betray each other is still an equilibrium, however, there can also exist multiple Nash equilibriums that vary based on the entanglement of the initial states. In the case where the states are only slightly entangled, there exists a certain unitary operation for Alice so that if Bob chooses betrayal every turn, Alice will actually gain more profit than Bob and vice versa. Thus, a profitable equilibrium can be reached in 2 additional ways. The case where the initial state is most entangled shows the most change from the classical game. In this version of the game, Alice and Bob each have an operator Q that allows for a payout equal to mutual cooperation with no risk of betrayal. This is a Nash equilibrium that also happens to be Pareto optimal.

Additionally, The quantum version of the Prisoner's Dilemma differs greatly from the classical version when the game is of unknown or infinite length. Classically, the infinite Prisoner's Dilemma has no defined fixed strategy but in the quantum version it is possible to develop an equilibrium strategy.

Quantum Chess

Quantum Chess was first developed by a graduate student at the University of Southern California named Chris Cantwell. His motivation to develop the game was to expose non-physicists to the world of quantum mechanics. 

The game utilizes the same pieces as classical chess (8 pawns, 2 knights, 2 bishops, 2 rooks, 1 queen, 1 king) and is won in the same manner (by capturing the opponent's king). However, the pieces are allowed to obey laws of quantum mechanics such as superposition. By allowed the introduction of superposition, it becomes possible for pieces to occupy more than one square in an instance. The movement rules for each piece are the same as classical chess. 

The biggest difference between quantum chess and classical chess is the check rule. Check is not included in quantum chess because it is possible for the king, as well as all other pieces, to occupy multiple spots on the grid at once. Another difference is the concept of movement to occupied space. Superposition also allows two occupies to share space or move through each other.

Capturing an opponent's piece is also slightly different in quantum chess than in classical chess. Quantum chess utilizes quantum measurement as a method of capturing. When attempting to capture an opponent's piece, a measurement is made to determine the probability of whether or not the space is occupied and if the path is blocked. If the probability is favorable, a move can be made to capture.

Quantum minimax theorems
The concepts of a quantum player, a  zero-sum quantum game and the associated expected payoff  were defined by A. Boukas in 1999 (for finite games) and in 2020 by L. Accardi and A. Boukas (for infinite games)  within the framework of the spectral theorem for self-adjoint operators on Hilbert spaces.  Quantum versions of Von Neumann's minimax theorem were proved.

See also
 Quantum tic-tac-toe: not a quantum game in the sense above, but a pedagogical tool based on metaphors for quantum mechanics
 Quantum pseudo-telepathy
 Quantum refereed game
 CHSH game
 Jan Sładkowski
 Jens Eisert

References

Further reading
 
 

Quantum information science
Game theory